is the oldest sub-temple of the Myōshin-ji Rinzai Zen Buddhist temple, situated in the northwest of Kyoto, Japan. It was founded by Zen priest Muinsoin in 1404.   The original temple buildings were burned during the Ōnin War (1467-1477), and were later rebuilt.

Taizō-in is well known for its two gardens.  The main garden, Motonobu-no-niwa, is a traditional Japanese dry landscape garden (karesansui), containing several angular rocks suggesting the cliffs of the island of Hōrai, with smaller stones suggesting a stream.  The planting is mostly evergreen, including camellia, pine, and Japanese umbrella pine.  It covers 50 tsubo (170 m²) and was designed to integrate a borrowing of scenery ("shakkei") of a view of Narabigaoka Hill in the distance.  It is thought to be the final work of Muromachi painter Kanō Motonobu (狩野 元信), reproducing one of his paintings in three dimensions.

A new pond garden, or yoko-en, was designed by Kinsaku Nakane in 1963–1966.  The new garden is large enough for visitors to walk in, and contains azaleas and a stream that cascades along the main axis, directly toward the main viewing position.  The stream flows around rocks, gradually widening until it empties into a pool in front of the viewer.

It is identified as a turning point in Muromachi painting, and represents a Zen koan.

References
Secret teachings in the art of Japanese gardens, David A. Slawson, p. 100
A guide to the gardens of Kyoto, Marc Treib and Ron Herman, p. 86

External links 
 Taizō-in Official website
 Head Temples of Zen Buddhism

1404 establishments in Asia
Rinzai temples
1400s establishments in Japan